Mossel may refer to:
Elchanan Mossel, professor of mathematics at the Massachusetts Institute of Technology
Hans Mossel (1905–1944), Dutch clarinetist and saxophonist
Jacob Mossel (1704–1761), Governor-General of the Dutch East Indies from 1750 to 1761

See also
Mossel Bay, a harbour town on the Southern Cape of South Africa
Mossel Bay pincushion (Leucospermum praecox), evergreen rounded upright shrub
Mossel Bay Commando, light infantry regiment of the South African Army
Mossel Bay Local Municipality in the Western Cape Province of South Africa